The 2015–16 season was the 136th season of competitive association football in England.

Promotion and relegation

Pre-season

New clubs 
Hereford F.C., a new club formed and owned by fans of defunct Hereford United F.C. were accepted into the Midland Football League Premier Division (Level 9)
Hackney Wick F.C., a new club founded in mid-2015 by Robert "Bobby" Kasanga, a non-league footballer since there were very few football clubs located within the Hackney Wick area, Kasanga proposed to others the formation of a community-based club. They were accepted into the Middlesex County Football League Division One Central & East (Level 12).

National teams

England national football team

UEFA Euro 2016 qualifying

UEFA Euro 2016

Friendlies

England women's national football team

2015 FIFA Women's World Cup

Group stage

Knockout rounds

2017 UEFA Women's European Championship qualification

Group 7

UEFA competitions

2015–16 UEFA Champions League

Play-off Round

|}

Group stage

Group B

Group D

Group F

Group G

Knockout phase

Round of 16
The draw for the round of 16 was held on 14 December 2015. The first legs were played on 16, 17, 23 and 24 February, and the second legs were played on 8, 9, 15 and 16 March 2016.

Quarter-finals
The draw for the quarter-finals was held on 18 March 2016. The first legs were played on 5 and 6 April, and the second legs were played on 12 and 13 April 2016.

Semi-finals
The draw for the semi-finals was held on 15 April 2016. The first legs were played on 26 and 27 April, and the second legs were played on 3 and 4 May 2016.

2015–16 UEFA Europa League

Qualifying rounds

First qualifying round

|}

Second qualifying round

|}

Third qualifying round

|}

Play-off round

|}

Group stage

Group B

Group J

Knockout phase

Round of 32
The draw for the round of 32 was held on 14 December 2015. The first legs were played on 16 and 18 February, and the second legs were played on 24 and 25 February 2016.

Round of 16
The draw for the round of 16 was held on 26 February 2016. The first legs were played on 10 March, and the second legs were played on 17 March 2016.

Quarter-finals
The draw for the quarter-finals was held on 18 March 2016. The first legs were played on 7 April, and the second legs were played on 14 April 2016.

Semi-finals
The draw for the semi-finals was held on 15 April 2016. The first legs were played on 28 April, and the second legs were played on 5 May 2016.

Final

The final was played on 18 May 2016 at the St. Jakob-Park in Basel, Switzerland. The "home" team (for administrative purposes) was determined by an additional draw held after the semi-final draw.

UEFA Youth League

UEFA Women's Champions League

League season

Premier League 

The most unexpected title race in Premier League history saw Leicester City defy all of their critics and win their first ever top-flight title in their 132-year history. Despite being tipped for relegation following the pre-season sacking of Nigel Pearson and replacing him with Claudio Ranieri, the Foxes remained in contention all season long and never once fell outside of the top seven, taking top spot in early January and never relinquishing it. This stunning achievement, coupled with a solid defence and the free-scoring efforts of Jamie Vardy (who broke the record for scoring in 11 consecutive Premier League games) and Riyad Mahrez, saw the club receive mass acclaim at home and abroad for their efforts. Leicester's triumph would mark the first first-time champion of English football since Nottingham Forest's first title win during the 1977–78 season, as well as the first time this happened in the Premier League era.

Growing fan protests towards manager Arsène Wenger saw Arsenal endure another trophyless season after a collapse in form, but they recovered well to secure their first second-placed finish in 11 years, while goalkeeper Petr Čech won the Golden Glove for having the most clean sheets. Tottenham Hotspur finished an unlikely third, their first since 1990 – despite a very slow start, a six-match winning run in early January saw them become Leicester's closest title challengers, until multiple slip-ups in their remaining games ruined their chances of finishing above North London rivals Arsenal and saw them miss out on the top two. Nevertheless, it was still a fantastic achievement for the club, who qualified for the Champions League for only the third time, whilst Harry Kane was the league's highest scorer with 25 goals.

Manchester City endured a disappointing league season, only just securing a Champions League spot, but made up for it in Manuel Pellegrini's last season in charge by winning the Football League Cup, as well as reaching the semi-finals of the Champions League for the first time, only narrowly losing to Real Madrid. Manchester United also suffered a similarly underwhelming season; like City they had looked like potential title challengers early on, before a dreadful run of form in the winter derailed any such hopes and led to growing anger from the fans towards manager Louis van Gaal's defensive style of play. While the emergence of promising young striker Marcus Rashford helped revitalise their season somewhat and they won the FA Cup for the first time since 2004, they ultimately missed out on a Champions League spot on goal difference, and as a result, at the end of the season, van Gaal was sacked.

Having finished seventh the previous year, Southampton went one further and finished in sixth place, successfully ensuring qualification for the Europa League group stages. Whilst they had spent the first half of the season surprisingly hovering above the relegation zone, the return of goalkeeper Fraser Forster from injury saw a massive change in fortunes. In their last ever season at Upton Park before moving to the Olympic Stadium, West Ham United enjoyed arguably their greatest league campaign since their highest-ever finish thirty years prior and qualified for the Europa League. Although too many draws prevented them from securing a Champions League spot, Slaven Bilić had a successful first campaign as manager, which included victories at Arsenal, Liverpool and Manchester City before the end of September.

A poor start to the season saw Liverpool replace Brendan Rodgers with Jürgen Klopp, which bought about a successful change in both performance and results. Though several dropped points prevented them from finishing higher than eighth, the club enjoyed a stunning Europa League run that took them to the final where they ultimately lost to Sevilla and ensured no European football for the following season. Chelsea endured a torrid campaign as they made arguably the worst title defence in modern footballing history, hovering above the relegation zone by mid-December; while the sacking of José Mourinho (just seven months after leading the club to their fourth Premier League title) for Guus Hiddink on a caretaker basis saw a massive improvement in league results, a lack of success in their other competitions saw the club finish in their lowest league position for 20 years and fail to qualify for any European competitions for the first time in 19 years.

Of the three promoted teams, Watford surprisingly performed the best, finishing in 13th place with more wins than their previous two top-flight campaigns combined. Despite suffering a steep drop in form in 2016, the Hornets were never seriously threatened with relegation and alongside reaching the FA Cup semi-finals, the club ensured a second successive top-flight campaign for the first time in nearly 30 years whilst star strike duo Odion Ighalo and Troy Deeney netted 28 goals between them. Having been in the race for European football at the turn of the year, a run of just two wins in 2016 saw Crystal Palace only just secure their place in the Premier League for the fourth season in a row, though a stunning run to the FA Cup Final more than made amends in Alan Pardew's first full season in charge. AFC Bournemouth's first-ever top-flight season quickly turned into a nightmare as long-term injuries to key players saw their form plummet and the chances of instant relegation increase – however, a six-match unbeaten run before Christmas which included successive wins over Chelsea and Manchester United, coupled with several bursts of good form, saw the Cherries secure their survival with several games to spare, a remarkable achievement for the club.

After nearly 30 years in the top-flight and a succession of lower finishes since the departure of Martin O'Neill in 2010, Aston Villa finally ran out of luck and were relegated in bottom place in a season that saw them change managers three times – after winning away on the opening day, they proceeded to win just two more games in the season as they finished their campaign with the third lowest points total in Premier League history of 17 points, their season not being helped further by growing fan protests towards the owners as well as a failure to replace key players such as Fabian Delph and Christian Benteke in the summer. Finishing above them were Norwich City; despite being tipped to finish higher than both their promotion rivals as well as making several signings in both transfer windows, the Canaries were simply unable to re-adapt to the fast pace of the top-flight and their inability to score was once again their downfall, despite a famous victory over Manchester United at Old Trafford in December. Taking the final relegation spot were Newcastle United, whose steep decline in form since qualifying for the Europa League in 2012 finally took its toll and they endured their second relegation from the top-flight in seven years, in spite of spending nearly £100 million on new players, as well as the managerial presence of both Steve McClaren and then Rafael Benítez late in the season.

Football League Championship 

In one of the tightest second-tier title races in history, Burnley ultimately edged out the opposition to win the title and secure an immediate return to the Premier League, their first top-flight bounce-back since the end of the 19th century. Having been adrift of the automatic promotion places at Christmas, the Clarets finished the season unbeaten in 23 games and record signing Andre Gray was their top scorer with 25 goals. Despite a nervy end to their season, Middlesbrough ultimately shook off their disappointing play-off final loss the previous season and returned to the Premier League after a seven-year absence, recording the best defense for the second year running and conceding just eight goals at home. Taking the final place through the play-offs were Hull City, who scraped past Sheffield Wednesday in the final and secured their own instant return to the top-flight, earning Steve Bruce his fourth promotion as a manager.

Brighton Hove & Albion enjoyed arguably their most successful season for many years, as they enjoyed their own unbeaten run of 21 games in the first half of the season and lost just five times overall, only just missing out on automatic promotion on goal difference and then losing in the playoffs. Having been well in the mix for promotion the previous season, Ipswich Town struggled to mount a real promotion charge and finished just five points off of the playoffs. Despite suffering from low home attendances, Cardiff City mounted a surprise promotion challenge, staying well in the fight until defeat in their penultimate game ended their hopes – manager Russell Slade was then promoted to head of football at the season's end.

At the bottom of the table, Bolton Wanderers were relegated in last place after a miserable season that saw them threatened with going out of business and failing to win one away game all season, falling into the third tier for the first time since 1993. Finishing above them were Milton Keynes Dons, who were unable to adapt to the fast pace of the second tier like both Preston North End (who made a surprise push for the playoffs after having been tipped to struggle) and Bristol City (who flirted with relegation throughout the season before a late surge pushed them up the table), and in stark contrast to their free-scoring promotion season a year prior, were ultimately undone by their complete inability to score. Filling the final relegation place were Charlton Athletic, whose bright start rapidly fell away and many of their results resulting in heavy losses – as with Aston Villa, their season was not helped by several fan protests against the club's owners and their policies on managerial and player signings.

Football League One

In their first season at this level for 12 years, Wigan Athletic ensured their drop in form was only temporary as they secured an immediate promotion back to the Championship, in no small part due a twenty-match unbeaten run mid-season. Burton Albion's first-ever season in the third tier resulted in a second successive promotion; for the second season in a row they lost their manager while heading the table, when Jimmy Floyd Hasselbaink moved to Queens Park Rangers, but the club's re-hiring of Nigel Clough for a second spell as manager kept their promotion challenge on-track, though several bursts of indifferent form (and a somewhat poor goal-scoring record) ensured that their promotion went to the last day. With this feat, Albion also brought second-tier League football back to their town since the dismissal of their predecessor club Burton United in 1907. Taking the final spot through the play-offs and returning to the Championship after two years were Barnsley – despite being bottom of League One in November and then losing their manager to Bristol City in January, in addition to only just scraping into the play-offs in the last few games, the Tykes ultimately enjoyed a successful season which also included winning the Football League Trophy, their first major trophy in over a hundred years.

After achieving survival in the previous two seasons, Crewe Alexandra ran out of luck at last, and they were relegated back to League Two after four years at this level, after a season in which they were never outside the bottom two after their fifth league game and won just seven times – their season was not helped by growing anger from the fans towards the owners for their continual refusal to sack manager Steve Davis. Colchester United fared little better as their awful defensive record, which saw them very nearly concede 100 goals in the league, helped doom them to the fourth tier for the first time since 1998. Blackpool suffered their second successive relegation and their third relegation in six years, falling into the fourth tier for the first time since 2001 amid ever-increasing supporter unrest at the Oyston family's ownership of the club and their continual refusal to sell. Doncaster Rovers occupied the final relegation spot; after poor early-season results, the appointment of Darren Ferguson as manager seemed to have revived their fortunes, but a terrible run of form after the turn of the year helped condemn them to relegation, with even a win against Wigan counting for nothing.

Football League Two 

Despite facing an uncertain future off-pitch towards the end of 2015, Northampton Town were promoted as champions, refusing to let the issues off-pitch affect their style of play and enjoying an impressive unbeaten run throughout 2016 – perhaps their only disappointment was suffering several draws in their last 10 games which just prevented them breaking the 100 point mark. Oxford United filled the second automatic spot in a successful season where they reached the final of the Football League Trophy competition, in which they narrowly lost to Barnsley and made the fourth round of the FA Cup. Finishing in third place on goal difference were Bristol Rovers, securing promotion in their first season back in the Football League and being in the promotion chase for virtually the whole season. Taking the final spot through the playoffs were AFC Wimbledon, who won promotion to the third tier for the first time in their 14-year history – coupled with the relegation of Milton Keynes Dons from the Championship, the two sides both claiming to be continuing the original Wimbledon club would be facing off in the same league for the first time from next season.

Portsmouth enjoyed their first successful season since winning the FA Cup in 2008, as they mounted a real promotion charge and were among the highest scorers in the league – their only real disappointment was suffering too many draws over the season which pushed them into the playoffs, where they narrowly lost to Plymouth. Yeovil Town almost suffered a third relegation in a row, but a good run of form following the appointment of former player Darren Way saw the club rocket up the table and survive comfortably in mid-table. Teddy Sheringham's first managerial role ended in disaster as he very nearly led Stevenage to relegation – it was only after his sacking that the club surged back up the table and secured their place in the Football League.

At the bottom of the table, York City's 4-year spell in the Football League was ended in a dreadful season where their defensive record was only marginally better than that of Morecambe and where they never once looked like staying up. Finishing just above them were Dagenham & Redbridge, whose run in the Football League came to an end despite a good late run of form.

National League Top Division 

Cheltenham Town secured an immediate return to the Football League as champions, becoming the first club to immediately bounce back as Conference/National League champions since Darlington in 1990 – throughout the season, they were rarely outside the top 2 and took advantage of the teams slipping up below them, breaking the 100 point mark in the process. Grimsby Town ultimately emerged victorious in the play-offs, ensuring a return to the Football League for the first time in six years.

Welling, who had only avoided relegation on goal difference the previous season, finished in bottom place. Kidderminster Harriers suffered from off-pitch turmoil and a financial crisis throughout the season, culminating in their relegation though they did finish the season with a six-game unbeaten run. Altrincham were relegated back to the Conference North after two seasons. FC Halifax Town occupied the final relegation spot, recovering well from terrible early-season form, but ultimately going down after other results went against them on the final day.

League play-offs

Football League play-offs

Cup competitions

FA Cup

Final

League Cup

Final

Community Shield

Football League Trophy

Final

Women's football

FA Women's Cup

Women's Super League

Women's Super League 1

Women's Super League 2

FA WSL Cup

Managerial changes 
This is a list of changes of managers within English league football:

Diary of the season 
 4 June: A plan to introduce an equivalent to the National Football League's Rooney Rule for the 2016–17 season is announced by The Football League. Under the mooted plan, clubs will be required to interview at least one ethnic minority candidate when recruiting a new first-team manager or youth coach.
 5 June: The Football League announces that the ten-point penalty for clubs who enter administration, which has been in place since the 2004–05 season, will be increased to 12 points starting with the forthcoming season. Another new regulation also requires the supporters' trust of any club which enters administration to be given the opportunity to submit a bid.
 7 August: The 2015–16 Football League season begins in Sussex as Brighton & Hove Albion beat Nottingham Forest 1–0 at Falmer Stadium: Kazenga LuaLua the scorer of the first goal of the top four divisions.
8 August: The new Premier League campaign kicks off as defending champions Chelsea start with a 2–2 draw at home to Swansea City, while Manchester United need a Kyle Walker own goal to give them a 1–0 win over Tottenham Hotspur at Old Trafford. Elsewhere, newly promoted AFC Bournemouth's Premier League bow ends in a 1–0 defeat at home to Aston Villa, while Watford hold Everton to a 2–2 draw at Goodison Park. £10 million summer signing Yohan Cabaye scores on his Crystal Palace debut in the Eagles' 3–1 win at Norwich City, and Riyad Mahrez nets a double for Leicester City in their 4–2 win at home to Sunderland.
9 August: Slaven Bilić started his tenure as West Ham United manager as they defeated Arsenal 2–0 at the Emirates Stadium. Elsewhere, Liverpool beat Stoke City with a late Philippe Coutinho goal earning them a 1–0 win at the Britannia Stadium.
 31 August: The first month of the new season ends with Manchester City as they stand top of the table with four wins from four, as the league's leading scorers and with no goals conceded. Crystal Palace have made a good start and stand three points behind City, while Leicester and Swansea remain unbeaten to hold joint third place. Manchester United, Arsenal and Liverpool complete the top seven. Reigning champions Chelsea have are in 13th with four points.  Stoke (18th), Newcastle United and Sunderland are joint bottom with two points each. In the Championship, Brighton & Hove Albion top this division. Hull City and Queens Park Rangers sandwich Ipswich Town in second and fourth. Unbeaten Cardiff City stand in fifth, while last season's play-off finalists Middlesbrough have edged ahead of Birmingham City, Charlton Athletic and Burnley to take sixth place. Bottom club Rotherham United have one point from their first five games, while Blackburn Rovers manage to stay ahead of the relegation zone on goal difference at the expense of Bolton Wanderers and Huddersfield Town.
 4 September: AFC Bournemouth lose two of their summer signings to long-term injury after their 1–1 draw with Leicester last weekend: Max Gradel is ruled out for six months and record signing Tyrone Mings is to be sidelined for the remainder of the season.
 5 September: England secure qualification for UEFA Euro 2016 by beating San Marino 6–0. Wayne Rooney also equals Bobby Charlton's record as the national team's all-time top goalscorer, with a goal scored from the penalty spot.
 8 September: Rooney exceeds Charlton's goalscoring record with a goal scored from the penalty spot in a 2–0 victory over Switzerland. The result also guarantees that England will finish their qualification group in first place.
 12 September: Eighteen-year-old substitute Kelechi Iheanacho scores the only goal of the game in stoppage time to propel Manchester City over Crystal Palace at Selhurst Park. On the same day, Steven Naismith hits a hat-trick as Everton condemn Chelsea to a 3–1 defeat at Goodison Park. It is Chelsea's third defeat already this season. Anthony Martial scores on his debut for Manchester United in a 3–1 win over Liverpool at Old Trafford. Watford earn their first win of the season in five attempts with a 1–0 win over Swansea City at Vicarage Road.
 19 September: Chelsea and Arsenal renew their rivalry in a capital clash at Stamford Bridge: the home side win 2–0 while the Gunners have Santi Cazorla and Gabriel sent off. Manchester City's unbeaten start to the season ends in 2–1 defeat at home to West Ham, who have already added away wins over Arsenal and Liverpool.
 22 September: The FA rescinds Gabriel's red card, while giving Diego Costa a retrospective three-match ban for his role in the flashpoint. Arsenal compiled and sent a package of video evidence to the FA, reportedly including footage from ESPN Brasil – unseen in England – that exonerated the defender.
 23 September: In the third round of the League Cup, Carlisle United hold Liverpool at Anfield for 120 minutes before being eliminated on penalties, Sheffield Wednesday knock out Newcastle, a Mathieu Flamini brace helps Arsenal win the North London derby over Tottenham, Southampton score six at stadium:mk, and David de Gea, who was close to leaving for Real Madrid less than a month previously, skippers Manchester United for the first time, wearing the armband for the final nine minutes of their win over Ipswich Town.
 26 September: Manchester City are knocked from the summit of the Premier League as they are beaten 4–1 at Tottenham; Harry Kane scores his first goal for Spurs this season. City's place at the top is taken by Manchester United, who put three past Sunderland without reply. In the late kick-off, Newcastle race into a 2–0 lead, only for Chelsea to level the match with two goals in the final 11 minutes. Alexis Sánchez scores his first Premier League hat-trick as Arsenal beat Leicester 5–2 at the King Power Stadium, ending the Foxes' unbeaten start to the season.
 30 September: The month ends with Manchester United having taken over the top of the table from their cross-city rivals.  Manchester City are a point behind them, with West Ham and Arsenal rounding out the top four. Everton, Tottenham and Crystal Palace are a point behind in the top seven. Chelsea are eight points behind Manchester United and four points above the relegation zone. Sunderland remain bottom with the same two points that they had a month prior, with rivals Newcastle above them by one point. Aston Villa, a further point ahead of Newcastle, fill the final relegation spot. Brighton continue to lead the way in the Championship, though Middlesbrough have cut their lead to just one point. Reading, Hull City, Birmingham City and Cardiff City are sat in the play-off spots, tied on 15 points apiece, with Burnley and Ipswich Town also on the same number of points. The three teams promoted from League One last season comprise the bottom three, with Bristol City now bottom, Milton Keynes Dons one point ahead, and Preston North End only ahead of the MK Dons on goal difference.
3 October: Sergio Agüero helps himself to a 20-minute second-half hat-trick as Manchester City come from a goal down to defeat Newcastle 6–1 at the Etihad Stadium. Chelsea have their fourth defeat in their opening eight games as they go down 3–1 at home to Southampton. Crystal Palace climb to third place with a 2–0 win over West Bromwich Albion.
4 October: Brendan Rodgers is sacked an hour after half time as Liverpool manager following their 1–1 draw with Everton in the Merseyside Derby at Goodison Park. Arsenal defeat Manchester United 3–0 at the Emirates Stadium, with Alexis Sánchez scoring a double inside a 20-minute spell in the first half. It is the first time that the Gunners have scored three goals against United since 2001, and it was also United's worst defeat against Arsenal since 1998.
 8–10 October: Chelsea's Serbian defensive pair Branislav Ivanović and Nemanja Matić, Newcastle goalkeeper Tim Krul, Manchester United midfielder Bastian Schweinsteiger and Manchester City attackers Sergio Agüero and David Silva all pick up injuries on international duty.
25 October: The Manchester derby ends in a 0–0 stalemate between United and City at Old Trafford. Harry Kane scores the second hat trick of his career as Tottenham have a win at AFC Bournemouth. Sunderland make it six-straight league wins over Newcastle as they beat their local rivals 3–0 at the Stadium of Light, giving Sam Allardyce his first win as Black Cats manager.
 31 October: The end of this month sees top spot having swung back in Manchester City's direction, though Arsenal are behind City on goal difference alone. Leicester are three points behind the top two. Manchester United, meanwhile, have slipped down to fourth place, a point behind Leicester, and West Ham are a further point behind United. Tottenham and Liverpool are in sixth and seventh place respectively. Aston Villa have fallen to bottom place, while Sunderland and Newcastle have both earned wins, but are still in the relegation zone, two points and one point respectively behind AFC Bournemouth. Brighton still lead the way in the Championship, but are now two points ahead of Hull and Burnley. Middlesbrough are three points off top, and Derby County are level with Middlesbrough on points, with Birmingham rounding out the top six. Rotherham have fallen back to bottom place, with Bolton ahead on goal difference and Charlton a point ahead of the bottom two.
6 November: Nélson Oliveira is the sole goalscorer in the East Midlands derby as Nottingham Forest beat Derby at the City Ground.
8 November: The North London derby between Arsenal and Tottenham ends 1–1 at the Emirates Stadium, while Crystal Palace defender Scott Dann scores the winning goal in their 2–1 win over Liverpool at Anfield, making it three straight league wins for the Eagles over the Reds.
28 November: Jamie Vardy scores for the 11th consecutive Premier League match in Leicester's 1–1 draw with Manchester United, setting a Premier League record. He is promptly congratulated on the feat by the former record-holder Ruud van Nistelrooy, who broadcast on Instagram, "Well done @vardy7! You're number one now and you deserved it. #11inarow." Junior Stanislas scores a late equaliser for AFC Bournemouth to salvage a point in their 3–3 draw with Everton, while Alan Pardew and Crystal Palace defeat Newcastle 5–1 at Selhurst Park. Junior Stanislas scores a late equaliser for AFC Bournemouth to salvage a point in their 3–3 draw with Everton, while Alan Pardew and Crystal Palace defeat Newcastle 5–1 at Selhurst Park.
30 November: Manchester City are leading the Premier League at the end of this month, again by virtue of goal difference, this time ahead of Leicester. Manchester United are a point behind the top two, and Arsenal a further point behind United. Tottenham have moved up to fifth place, and behind them are a whole clutch of sides, with five points separating sixth placed Liverpool and 13th-placed West Brom. Aston Villa remain bottom and are now five points adrift of second-bottom Newcastle while Sunderland have moved out of the relegation zone at AFC Bournemouth's expense. Brighton continue to lead the way in the Championship, still by two points, with Middlesbrough having moved back up to second place. Derby are behind Middlesbrough only on goals scored, and Hull and Burnley remain hot on their heels, one point and two points respectively behind them. Birmingham City occupy the final play-off spot on goal difference, heading up a large chasing pack. Bolton have fallen to the foot of the table, three points off the pace, with Rotherham United and Huddersfield Town also in the relegation zone, but just a point behind the three sides above them.
5 December: Leicester go top of the Premier League with a Riyad Mahrez hat trick helping them to a 3–0 win at Swansea. The Foxes displace former leaders Manchester City, who go down to a 2–0 defeat at Stoke. Chelsea lose for the eighth time this season in a 1–0 home defeat to AFC Bournemouth. Meanwhile, the FA Cup reaches round two: non-leaguers Eastleigh win away at Stourbridge to qualify for round three for the first time and Welsh side Newport County seal their first entry into the third round since the Monmouthshire club reformed in 1989 with victory over Barnet.
6 December: In more second round action, League Two Exeter City are the only side to defeat a club from a higher division, dispatching third-tier Port Vale. Elsewhere, Whitehawk reach the third-round draw for the first time in their history – the East Brightonians' goal in the 95th minute cancels out 40-year-old Jamie Cureton's opener for Dagenham & Redbridge – and at half-time in the match between Welling United and Carlisle United, £522 is raised for the Cumbrian Relief Fund, geared to helping with the fallout from Storm Desmond.
8 December: Differing fortunes for the Mancunian sides in Europe: Raheem Sterling scores a double as City top their group following a 4–2 win over Borussia Mönchengladbach, while United drop down into the UEFA Europa League after being beaten 3–2 at VfL Wolfsburg.
12 December: AFC Bournemouth beat Manchester United 2–1 at the Vitality Stadium. Romelu Lukaku scores for the sixth consecutive game in Everton's 1–1 draw at Norwich.
17 December: After losing 9 out of 16 league games, and being a point outside the relegation zone, Chelsea announced that they have parted company with manager José Mourinho "by mutual consent". They went on to say, "The club wishes to make clear José leaves us on good terms and will always remain a much-loved, respected and significant figure at Chelsea."
19 December: Manchester United lose 2–1 at home to Norwich, which is the first time that the Canaries have beaten United at Old Trafford since 1989. The result means United fall out of the top four on goal difference.  Riyad Mahrez scores two penalties in a 3–2 win over Everton at Goodison Park.
20 December: Odion Ighalo scores a double as Watford go four games unbeaten with a 3–0 win over Liverpool at Vicarage Road.
26 December: Vincent Kompany is reintroduced to the Manchester City side as a substitute in their match at Sunderland, only to leave the field nine minutes later as City win 4–1. Their cross-city rivals, United, lose for the third league game in a row following a 2–0 defeat at Stoke. Guus Hiddink's second spell as Chelsea manager begins with a Diego Costa double in a 2–2 draw at home to Watford. Leicester have their second defeat of the campaign, losing 1–0 at Liverpool. Arsenal are beaten 4–0 at Southampton, with Shane Long bagging a double for the Saints. The result is Arsenal's worst defeat in the league since losing 6–0 to Chelsea in March 2014.
29 December: Leeds United owner Massimo Cellino takes the unprecedented step of attempting to ban Sky Sports from televising the club's home game with Derby County, blaming the televising of games for disrupting the club's schedule. Later in the day, Cellino relents and allows the game to be televised.
30 December: The Premier League schedule for 2015 is rounded out by Liverpool's 1–0 win over Sunderland: Christian Benteke the sole goalscorer at the Stadium of Light.
31 December: 2015 ends with Arsenal having taken over the top of the Premier League, and Leicester once again second on goal difference. Manchester City have dropped to third place, three points behind the top two, while Tottenham have moved into the top four, a point behind City. Crystal Palace, enjoying their best ever start in the top flight since 1990, have moved up to fifth place, while Manchester United are now sixth, as a six-game run without a win has seen manager Louis van Gaal under serious pressure from the fans, and level on points with Liverpool. Aston Villa remain bottom, still having not recorded a win since the opening day and are 11 points off safety, while a run of five-straight defeats has also left Sunderland seven points off safety. Newcastle remain in the relegation zone, though are five points ahead of the Mackems. Middlesbrough have taken over the lead in the Championship, a point ahead of Derby County. Hull and Brighton are both four points off the top two, with Burnley and Ipswich rounding out the play-off spaces. Bolton remain bottom, now just four points off safety following some improved results, though financial problems and the threat of administration still hang over them. Charlton and Bristol City have now fallen into the relegation zone, two points and four points respectively ahead of Bolton, and with Rotherham United ahead of Bristol only on goal difference.
12 January: After 19 league games without a win, Aston Villa record their second win of the season with a 1–0 win over Crystal Palace at Villa Park. A Wayne Rooney double is not enough for Manchester United as they are held 3–3 at Newcastle after a goal from Paul Dummett.
13 January: Jermain Defoe scores his fourth Premier League hat-trick in a Sunderland 4–2 win at Swansea. Liverpool and Arsenal have a 3–3 draw at Anfield, with Reds midfielder Joe Allen netting a last minute equaliser. This allows Leicester to go level on points with the Gunners at the top of the table with a 1–0 win at Tottenham.
23 January: Liverpool defeat Norwich 5–4. Canaries defender Sébastien Bassong scores an injury time equaliser before Adam Lallana wins it for the Reds. New Southampton striker Charlie Austin scores seven minutes into his debut as they win 1–0 at Manchester United, while Dele Alli scores in Tottenham's 3–1 win at Crystal Palace. Elsewhere, a Sergio Agüero double rescues a point for Manchester City in their 2–2 draw at West Ham.
31 January: The first month of 2016 ends with Leicester now three points clear at the top of the Premier League. Manchester City and Arsenal are second and third, with City ahead of Arsenal on goal difference. Tottenham are a further two points behind City and Arsenal.  Manchester United are in fifth place, five points behind Spurs.  United head up a large chasing pack, with just four points separating them and ninth-placed Stoke.  Aston Villa are ten points off safety. North-East rivals Newcastle and Sunderland remain in the relegation zone, two points and four points from safety respectively. Hull are now leading the Championship, a point ahead of Middlesbrough, who have a game in hand. Burnley, Brighton, Derby County and Birmingham City are currently in the play-off spots, with Sheffield Wednesday and Ipswich Town following close behind. The bottom three remain the same as a month previously, though Charlton have moved to being within a point of safety, and Bolton can close on the sides above them by winning their game in hand.
2 February: Jamie Vardy scores twice as Leicester beat Liverpool 2–0 to maintain their three-point lead at the top of the Premier League. Manchester City keep pace with a 1–0 win at Sunderland, while a Harry Kane brace helps Tottenham beat Norwich 3–0 at Carrow Road. Arsenal drop to fourth after a goalless draw at home to Southampton. Aston Villa remain rooted to the bottom after a 2–0 defeat at West Ham, their 15th defeat of the season.
6 February: The early kick-off at the Eitihad Stadium sees Leicester defeat Manchester City 3–1 to extend their lead at the top to five points. Tottenham jump into second place with a 1–0 win at home to Watford. At Anfield, thousands of Liverpool fans stage a 77th minute walkout in protest at high ticket prices. It is not enough, however, as they throw away a two-goal lead in a 2–2 draw with Sunderland. At the bottom, Aston Villa pick up just their third (and final) win of the campaign by beating struggling Norwich 2–0 at Villa Park.
7 February: Diego Costa's late equaliser earns a point for Chelsea in their 1–1 draw with Manchester United at Stamford Bridge. Arsenal win 2–0 at AFC Bournemouth.
11 February: Sunderland sack winger Adam Johnson, following his pleading guilty to a charge of underage sex. Two further charges of the same crime still remain against Johnson, who pleaded not guilty to them.
13 February: Manchester United crash to their seventh defeat of the season, losing 2–1 at Sunderland. The result deals a huge blow to United's hopes of qualifying for the Champions League. Norwich throw away a two-goal lead to draw 2–2 with West Ham at Carrow Road, while a Troy Deeney double helps Watford to a 2–1 win at Crystal Palace, leaving the Eagles without a win in 9 league games.
14 February: The top of the table clash at the Emirates Stadium sees Arsenal beat Leicester 2–1, a late Danny Welbeck goal allowing the Gunners to move within 2 points of the Foxes. North London rivals Tottenham win 2–1 against Manchester City, completing the double over City in the process. Aston Villa lose 6–0 to Liverpool at Villa Park, which is the club's worst home defeat for 81 years.
28 February: Manchester City win the first domestic trophy of the season, beating Liverpool on penalties in the 2016 Football League Cup Final after a 1–1 draw. City goalkeeper Willy Caballero saved all but one of Liverpool's penalties. In the Premier League, Manchester United get revenge on Arsenal for their heavy defeat at the Emirates earlier in the season by defeating them 3–2 at Old Trafford after a double from Marcus Rashford.
29 February: Leicester City continue to lead the way in the Premier League at the end of this month, still by two points, with Tottenham Hotspur now their nearest rivals. Arsenal are three points behind their north London rivals, with Manchester City four points behind Arsenal, though with a game in hand. Manchester United are in fifth place and now just three points behind their cross-city rivals although they have played a game more than City. West Ham are a point behind Manchester United in sixth place.  For the third successive month, Aston Villa are bottom, Sunderland second-bottom and Newcastle third-bottom; Sunderland and Newcastle are only in the relegation zone via one point and goal difference respectively, but Villa are still in very serious trouble, seven points behind Sunderland. Burnley are now heading up the promotion race in the Championship, a point ahead of Hull City, though Middlesbrough can overtake them both if they get even a single point from either of their games in hand. Brighton have moved back into automatic promotion contention, while Derby County and Sheffield Wednesday remain in the play-off zone, with a solid lead (five points and three points respectively) over the chasing pack. Charlton have now fallen to the bottom of the table, seven points adrift of safety, with Bolton are only ahead of them on goal difference. Rotherham are also in the relegation zone, three points behind the MK Dons.
18 March: Manchester United and Liverpool are both charged by UEFA for varying reasons, including chants referring to the Hillsborough and Munich disasters.
24 March: Following a second conviction for underage sex (though being acquitted on a third charge), Adam Johnson is sentenced to six years in prison.
31 March: March ends with Leicester City five points clear at the top of the Premier League, though Tottenham Hotspur continue to pursue them, and have a far superior goal difference. Arsenal have a game in hand on the top two, but are eleven points behind Leicester. Manchester City are a further four points behind Arsenal, and one point ahead of West Ham and Manchester United, who are separated by just a single goal. At the other end of the table, managerless Aston Villa are looking all but certain to be relegated, 12 points off safety with just 21 left to play for. Newcastle and Sunderland still make up the relegation places, three points and two points respectively behind Norwich. In the Championship, Burnley have a four-point lead over second-place Brighton, but Middlesbrough can go within two points of Burnley if they win their game in hand. Hull, Derby and Sheffield Wednesday make up the play-off spots. At the bottom, Bolton are twelve points off safety and looking increasingly likely to be relegated, while Charlton are six points off safety. MK Dons have now dropped into the relegation zone, following an unbeaten month for Rotherham, which has seen them leapfrog both the Dons and Fulham.
6 April: Honours even at the Parc des Princes as Manchester City draw 2–2 with Paris SG in the first leg in the quarter-final of the Champions League.
7 April: In the Europa League, Borussia Dortmund and Liverpool play out a 1–1 draw at Westfalenstadion: Divock Origi is the scorer of the Kopites' away goal.
8 April: Liverpool are charged by UEFA for the second time in this Europa League campaign: this time for their supporters releasing fireworks in the match against BVB.
9 April: Northampton Town become the first side in the top four divisions to win promotion this season, after holding Bristol Rovers to a 2–2 draw. Conversely, Bolton Wanderers and Crewe Alexandra are the first League sides to be relegated, with Bolton being sent down by a 4–1 defeat by Derby County, while Crewe are relegated by a combination of losing to Port Vale, and relegation rivals Oldham Athletic's victory over Walsall. Aston Villa are also left on the brink of relegation from the Premier League, 15 points from safety with only five games left. Arsenal's 2–0 lead over West Ham United is reduced, negated and overturned in eight minutes, courtesy of Andy Carroll's first hat-trick since August 2010; the Gunners and Hammers eventually share the points, after an errant offside flag denied Manuel Lanzini an early opener. Elsewhere in the capital, Crystal Palace taste victory for the first time this calendar year with a 1–0 home win over Norwich City.
10 April: Jamie Vardy scores late on for Leicester as they beat Sunderland 2–0 to confirm their place in next season's UEFA Champions League. Tottenham Hotspur, meanwhile, beat Manchester United 3–0 at White Hart Lane after goals from Dele Alli, Toby Alderweireld and Erik Lamela. It is the second time this season that United have lost a match by three goals or more, and are left four points off fourth–placed Manchester City.
16 April: Aston Villa are relegated to the second tier of English football for the first time since 1987 after they lose 1–0 to Manchester United at Old Trafford. Elsewhere, in League Two, Dagenham & Redbridge are relegated to the National League after losing 3–2 to Leyton Orient at Brisbane Road, ending their nine-year stay in the Football League.
23 April: In the Premier League, Rafael Benítez makes his first return to Anfield as an opposition manager and his Newcastle side score a pair of second-half goals to draw level at the Kopites. In the Football League, MK Dons lose their lead and their Championship status after losing 4–1 at home to Brentford; at the top of the second tier, Brighton's win over Charlton Athletic sees them join Middlesbrough and Burnley with 87 points from 44 games and only goal difference keeping the South Coast side out of the automatic promotion places. Colchester United and York City are confirmed as relegated from Leagues One and Two respectively.
 26 April: After nearly three weeks of deliberation, the jury in the Hillsborough Inquest finds that the 96 fans who died as a result of crushing at the 1989 FA Cup semi-final, were unlawfully killed, ending 27 years of campaigning by the victims families to overturn what was perceived as one of the worst miscarriages of justice in British history. The verdict was marked by fans of both Liverpool and Everton in their league games on the following weekend.
 30 April: April ends with Leicester three points away from the title as they stand seven points clear of Tottenham with three games left. Arsenal and Manchester City's title challenges are mathematically over, and the objective is now to see off West Ham, Manchester United and Liverpool in the race for Champions League qualification. Aston Villa are confirmed as the bottom-placed team for the season, but a four-game unbeaten run has seen Newcastle climb clear of the relegation zone, although Sunderland (1 point behind) and Norwich (2 points) have a game in hand over the Toon, and Swansea and Crystal Palace have not yet mathematically confirmed safety. Middlesbrough now lead the Championship by one point, but only because Burnley and Brighton (joint second) are yet to play their 45th game. Hull, Derby and Sheffield Wednesday have confirmed their play-off places, and Bolton, MK Dons, and Charlton have confirmed their relegation to League One.
2 May: Leicester City's first-ever league title is finally confirmed, as Tottenham's failure to beat Chelsea leaves them seven points behind Leicester with only six left to play for.
7 May: The Championship season ends with Burnley finishing top of the League, beating already-relegated Charlton Athletic 3–0. Middlesbrough and ten-man Brighton drew 1–1, a result that takes Boro up at the Albion's expense. They will instead face the playoffs, as will Hull City, Derby County and Sheffield Wednesday.
8 May: The final day of the League One season sees Wigan Athletic crowned champions, with Burton Albion joining them in the second tier next season. Walsall, Millwall, Bradford City and Barnsley make up the playoff picture, the latter keeping out Scunthorpe United on goal difference alone. At the bottom of the division, Doncaster Rovers and 2010–11 Premier League club Blackpool are relegated to the basement tier.
9 May: Burnley are presented with the Football League Championship trophy outside Burnley Town Hall after security risks at The Valley prevented the trophy reaching south London on the final day.
11 May: Sunderland beat Everton; a result that relegates both Newcastle United and Norwich City, despite the Canaries' 4–2 victory over Watford.
15 May: The final day of action in the Premier League sees Arsenal overhaul rivals Tottenham Hotspur for second place, after the latter unexpectedly suffer a 5–1 defeat at the hands of already-relegated Newcastle United. However, by far the biggest story of the day is that Manchester United's game against AFC Bournemouth is postponed because of a terror threat, after a suspected bomb is found at Old Trafford. The device in fact turns out to be a fake bomb accidentally left there as part of an anti-terrorism drill earlier in the week, but the game's postponement leaves the final league placings still undecided; United cannot realistically overhaul neighbours Manchester City for the final Champions League spot, barring an infeasible 19-goal victory over Bournemouth in the replayed fixture, but they can take fifth place from Southampton so long as they avoid defeat.
17 May: Manchester United beat AFC Bournemouth 3–1 to finish in fifth place in the Premier League behind their neighbours Manchester City and ahead of Southampton.
21 May: Manchester United beat Crystal Palace 2–1 in the FA Cup Final at Wembley Stadium. Soon after the match, Louis van Gaal is sacked and replaced as manager by José Mourinho.

Deaths 
 2 June 2015: Dennis Fidler, 76, Manchester City, Port Vale, Grimsby Town, Halifax Town and Darlington winger.
 4 June 2015: Roy Stroud, 90, West Ham United forward.
 4 June 2015: Ray Weigh, 86, A.F.C. Bournemouth, Stockport County, Shrewsbury Town and Aldershot forward.
 7 June 2015: Ken Barrett, 77, Aston Villa and Lincoln City winger.
 10 June 2015: Johnny Fullam, 75, Republic of Ireland and Preston North End winger.
 11 June 2015: Ian McKechnie, 73, Arsenal, Southend United and Hull City goalkeeper.
 11 June 2015: Jimmy Robertson, 86, Arsenal and Brentford winger.
 15 June 2015: Doug Anderson, 51, Oldham Athletic, Tranmere Rovers, Plymouth Argyle, Cambridge United and Northampton Town winger
 June 2015: Howard Johnson, 89, Sheffield United and York City defender.
 18 June 2015: Brian Taylor, 78, Walsall, Shrewsbury Town, Birmingham City, Rotherham United, Port Vale and Barnsley winger.
 25 June 2015: Gordon Fearnley, 65, Sheffield Wednesday and Bristol Rovers forward.
 26 June 2015: Denis Thwaites, 70, Birmingham City outside left.
 26 June 2015: Larry Carberry, 79, Ipswich Town and Barrow right back.
 10 July 2015: Jimmy Murray, 82, Scotland and Reading forward.
 16 July 2015: Brian Hall, 68, Liverpool, Plymouth Argyle and Burnley midfielder.
 20 July 2015: Fred Else, 82, Preston North End, Blackburn Rovers and Barrow goalkeeper.
 20 July 2015: Des Horne, 75, Wolverhampton Wanderers and Blackpool winger.
 22 July 2015: Bobby Jones, 76, Bristol Rovers, Northampton Town and Swindon Town forward.
 5 August 2015: Tony Millington, 72, West Bromwich Albion, Crystal Palace, Peterborough United, Swansea City and Wales goalkeeper.
 6 August 2015: Danny Hegan, 72, Northern Ireland, Ipswich Town, West Bromwich Albion, Wolverhampton Wanderers and Sunderland midfielder.
 9 August 2015: Jack Hadlington, 82, Walsall winger.
 12 August 2015: Chris Marustik, 54, Swansea City, Cardiff City, Newport County and Wales defender.
 16 August 2015: Derek Stroud, 85, AFC Bournemouth and Grimsby Town winger.
 17 August 2015: Sandy Kennon, 81, Huddersfield Town, Norwich City and Colchester United goalkeeper.
 18 August 2015: Edgar Rumney, 78, Colchester United full back.
 22 August 2015: Tommy Lowry, 69, Crewe Alexandra and Liverpool defender.
 29 August 2015: Graham Leggat, 81, Scotland, Fulham, Birmingham City and Rotherham United winger.
 30 August 2015: George Fisher, 90, Millwall, Fulham and Colchester United full back.
 September 2015: Ken Horne, 89, Brentford wing half.
 6 September 2015: Ralph Milne, 54, Charlton Athletic, Bristol City and Manchester United midfielder.
 6 September 2015: Tom Paul, 82, Grimsby Town winger.
 11 September 2015: Fred Lucas (footballer), 81, Charlton Athletic and Crystal Palace wing half.
 12 September 2015: Jim Doherty, 61, Notts County midfielder.
 12 September 2015: Malcolm Graham, 81, Barnsley, Bristol City, Leyton Orient and Queens Park Rangers striker.
 12 September 2015: Ron Springett, 80, England, Sheffield Wednesday and Queens Park Rangers goalkeeper.
 14 September 2015: Bob Ledger, 77, Huddersfield Town, Oldham Athletic, Mansfield Town and Barrow midfielder.
 14 September 2015: Barrie Meyer, 83, Bristol Rovers, Plymouth Argyle, Newport County and Bristol City inside forward.
 15 September 2015: Tommy Thompson, 86, England, Newcastle United, Aston Villa, Preston North End, Stoke City and Barrow inside forward.
 25 September 2015: Pat Dunne, 72, Republic of Ireland, Manchester United and Plymouth Argyle goalkeeper.
 25 September 2015: Joe Wilson, 78, Workington, Nottingham Forest, Wolverhampton Wanderers and Newport County full back.
 2 October 2015: Johnny Paton, 92, Chelsea, Brentford and Watford outside left, who also had a short spell as manager of Watford.
 10 October 2015: Kane Ashcroft, 29, York City midfielder.
 14 October 2015: Bobby Braithwaite, 78, Northern Ireland and Middlesbrough winger.
 17 October 2015: Howard Kendall, 69, Preston North End, Everton, Birmingham City, Stoke City and Blackburn Rovers midfielder, who had successfully managed Everton and also had spells in charge of Blackburn Rovers, Manchester City, Notts County and Sheffield United.
 17 October 2015: Johnny Hamilton, 66, Millwall midfielder.
 19 October 2015: Ron Greener, 81, Newcastle United and Darlington centre half.
 23 October 2015: Peter Price, 83, Darlington forward.
 2 November 2015: Arthur Shaw, 91, Arsenal, Brentford and Watford wing half.
 6 November 2015: Bobby Campbell, 78, Liverpool, Portsmouth and Aldershot wing half, who also managed Fulham, Portsmouth and Chelsea.
 7 November 2015: David Shawcross, 74, Manchester City, Stockport County and Halifax Town wing half.
 8 November 2015: Harry Clarke, 94, Darlington, Leeds United and Hartlepool United forward.
 12 November 2015: Márton Fülöp, 32, Hungary, Sunderland, Manchester City, Ipswich Town and West Bromwich Albion goalkeeper.
 17 November 2015: Jackie McGugan, 76, Leeds United and Tranmere Rovers defender.
 27 November 2015: Ian Dargie, 84, Brentford centre half.
 28 November 2015: Gerry Byrne, 77, England and Liverpool left back.
 29 November 2015: Joe Marston, 89, Australia and Preston North End defender.
 6 December 2015: Mick McLaughlin, 72, Newport County and Hereford United defender.
 8 December 2015: Alan Hodgkinson, 79, England and Sheffield United goalkeeper.
 19 December 2015: Jimmy Hill, 87, Brentford and Fulham forward, who also managed Coventry City and was chairman at Coventry, Charlton Athletic and Fulham.
 23 December 2015: Don Howe, 80, England, West Bromwich Albion and Arsenal full back, who managed West Bromwich Albion, Arsenal and Queens Park Rangers as well as assistant coach with the England national team.
 27 December 2015: Roy Swinbourne, 86, Wolverhampton Wanderers forward.
 29 December 2015: Pavel Srnicek, 47, Czech Republic, Newcastle United, Sheffield Wednesday, Portsmouth and West Ham United goalkeeper.
 31 December 2015: Steve Gohouri, 34, Ivory Coast and Wigan Athletic defender.
 3 January 2016: Amby Fogarty, 82, Republic of Ireland, Sunderland and Hartlepool United midfielder.
 4 January 2016: John Roberts, 69, Wales, Swansea City, Northampton Town, Arsenal, Birmingham City, Wrexham and Hull City defender.
 5 January 2016: Percy Freeman, 70, West Bromwich Albion, Lincoln City and Reading forward.
 12 January 2016: Tommy Mulgrew, 86, Northampton Town, Newcastle United, Southampton and Aldershot forward.
 20 January 2016: Stuart Cowden, 90, Stoke City half back.
 22 January 2016: Tommy Bryceland, 76, Norwich City and Oldham Athletic forward.
 22 January 2016: John Dowie, 60, Fulham and Doncaster Rovers midfielder.
 24 January 2016: Ken Satchwell, 76, Coventry City and Walsall striker.
 24 January 2016: Eric Webster, 84, Manchester City wing half, who also had a spell as manager of Stockport County.
 26 January 2016: Ray Pointer, 79, England, Burnley, Bury, Coventry City and Portsmouth striker.
 27 January 2016: Peter Baker, 84, Tottenham Hotspur right back.
 28 January 2016: Dave Thomson, 77, Leicester City forward.
 4 February 2016: David Sloan, 74, Northern Ireland, Scunthorpe United, Oxford United and Walsall midfielder. (death announced on this date)
 9 February 2016: Graham Moore, 74, Wales, Cardiff City, Chelsea, Manchester United, Northampton Town, Charlton Athletic and Doncaster Rovers midfielder.
 10 February 2016: Phil Gartside, 63, Bolton Wanderers chairman.
 15 February 2016: Paul Bannon, 58, Carlisle United and Bristol Rovers forward.
 16 February 2016: Ronnie Blackman, 90, Reading, Nottingham Forest and Ipswich Town forward.
 18 February 2016: Johnny Miller, 65, Ipswich Town, Norwich City, Mansfield Town and Port Vale winger.
 19 February 2016: Freddie Goodwin, 82, Manchester United, Leeds United and Scunthorpe United wing half, who also managed Scunthorpe, Brighton & Hove Albion and Birmingham City.
 28 February 2016: Alex Stenhouse, 83, Portsmouth and Southend United winger.
 6 March 2016: Wally Bragg, 86, Brentford centre half.
 14 March 2016: Davy Walsh, 92, Ireland (FAI), West Bromwich Albion, Aston Villa and Walsall centre forward.
 16 March 2016: Alan Spavin, 74, Preston North End inside forward.
 March 2016: Jack Boxley, 84, Bristol City and Coventry City outside left.
 19 March 2016: Jack Mansell, 88, Brighton & Hove Albion, Cardiff City and Portsmouth defender, who also managed Rotherham United and Reading amongst others.
 30 March 2016: John King, 77, Everton, Bournemouth & Boscombe Athletic, Tranmere Rovers and Port Vale wing half, who had two notable spells as manager of Tranmere Rovers.
 31 March 2016: Ian Britton, 61, Chelsea, Blackpool and Burnley midfielder.
 31 March 2016: Jimmy Toner, 91. Leeds United winger.
 4 April 2016: Ken Waterhouse, 86, Preston North End, Rotherham United, Bristol City and Darlington wing half.
 5 April 2016: John Waite, 74, Grimsby Town winger.
 6 April 2016: Garry Jones, 65, Bolton Wanderers, Blackpool and Hereford United forward.
 8 April 2016: Fred Middleton, 85, Lincoln City wing half.
 22 April 2016: John Lumsden, 55, Stoke City midfielder.
 23 April 2016: Errol Crossan, 85, Gillingham, Southend United, Norwich City and Leyton Orient winger.
 6 May 2016: Chris Mitchell, 27, Bradford City midfielder.
 7 May 2016: George Ross, 73, Preston North End and Southport full back.
 15 May 2016: Bobby McIlvenny, 89, Oldham Athletic, Bury, Southport and Barrow inside forward.
 21 May 2016: Alan Lewis, 61, Derby County, Brighton & Hove Albion and Reading full back.
 25 May 2016: Ian Gibson, 73, Accrington Stanley, Bradford Park Avenue, Middlesbrough, Coventry City, Cardiff City and A.F.C. Bournemouth midfielder.

Retirements 

 8 June 2015: Wade Elliott, 36, former Bournemouth, Burnley, Birmingham City and Bristol City midfielder.
 16 June 2015: John Oster, 36, former Wales, Grimsby Town, Everton, Sunderland, Burnley, Reading, Crystal Palace, Doncaster Rovers and Barnet midfielder.
 10 July 2015: Jason Koumas, 35, former Wales, Tranmere Rovers, West Bromwich Albion and Wigan Athletic midfielder.
 14 July 2015: Steven Caldwell, 34, former Scotland, Newcastle United, Sunderland, Burnley, Wigan Athletic and Birmingham City defender.
 17 July 2015: James Chambers, 34, former West Bromwich Albion, Watford, Leicester City, Doncaster Rovers and Walsall full back
 20 July 2015: Cherno Samba, 29, former Gambia and Plymouth Argyle striker.
 4 August 2015: Keith Andrews, 34, former Republic of Ireland, Wolverhampton Wanderers, Hull City. Milton Keynes Dons, Blackburn Rovers, West Bromwich Albion and Bolton Wanderers midfielder.
 9 August 2015: Lee Bell, 32, former Crewe Alexandra, Mansfield Town, Macclesfield Town and Burton Albion midfielder.
 16 August 2015: Steve Banks, 43, former Gillingham, Blackpool, Bolton Wanderers, Stoke City and Wimbledon goalkeeper.
 27 August 2015: Ian Harte, 37, former Republic of Ireland, Leeds United, Sunderland, Blackpool, Carlisle United, Reading and Bournemouth defender.
 4 September 2015: Kevin Davies, 38, former England, Chesterfield, Southampton, Blackburn Rovers, Bolton Wanderers and Preston North End forward.
 10 September 2015: Stuart Parnaby, 33, former Middlesbrough, Birmingham City and Hartlepool United defender.
 14 September 2015: Anthony Griffith, 28, former Montserrat, Doncaster Rovers, Port Vale, Leyton Orient, Shrewsbury Town and Carlisle United midfielder.
 15 September 2015: Johannes Ertl, 32, former Austria, Crystal Palace, Sheffield United and Portsmouth midfielder.
 19 October 2015: Mitchell Hanson, 27, former Oxford United defender.
 20 October 2015: Djibril Cissé, 34, former France, Liverpool and Queens Park Rangers forward.
 2 November 2015: Anders Svensson, 39, former Sweden and Southampton midfielder.
 10 November 2015: Anthony Réveillère, 35, former Sunderland defender.
 11 December 2015: Gilberto Silva, 39, former Brazil and Arsenal midfielder.
 21 December 2015: Damien Duff, 36, former Republic of Ireland, Blackburn Rovers, Chelsea, Newcastle United and Fulham winger.
 7 January 2016: Jermaine Jenas, 32, former England, Nottingham Forest, Newcastle United, Tottenham Hotspur and Queens Park Rangers midfielder.
 21 January 2016: Brett Ormerod, 39, former Blackpool, Southampton and Preston North End forward.
 28 January 2016: Robert Earnshaw, 34, former Wales, Cardiff City, West Bromwich Albion, Norwich City, Derby County, Nottingham Forest and Blackpool forward.
 28 January 2016: Darius Vassell, 35, former England, Aston Villa, Manchester City and Leicester City forward.
 29 January 2016: Nemanja Vidić, 34, former Serbia and Manchester United defender.
 1 February 2016: John Heitinga, 32, former Netherlands, Everton and Fulham defender.
 3 February 2016: Keith Southern, 34, former Blackpool, Huddersfield Town and Fleetwood Town midfielder.
 3 February 2016: Stuart Holden, 30, former USA and Bolton Wanderers midfielder.
 13 February 2016: Jack Collison, 27, former Wales, West Ham United and Peterborough United midfielder.
 19 February 2016: Andy Wilkinson, 31, former Stoke City right back.
 1 May 2016: Patrick Kisnorbo, 35, former Australia, Leicester City, Leeds United and Ipswich Town defender.
 9 May 2016: Michael Duff, 38, former Northern Ireland, Cheltenham Town and Burnley defender.
 8 May 2016: Ruben Zadkovich, 29, former Australia, Notts County and Derby County midfielder.
 17 May 2016: Richard Wright, 38, former England, Ipswich Town, Arsenal, Everton, West Ham United and Sheffield United goalkeeper.
 18 May 2016: Barry Robson, 37, former Scotland, Middlesbrough and Sheffield United midfielder.
 29 May 2016: Stephen Hunt, 34, former Republic of Ireland, Crystal Palace, Brentford, Reading, Hull City, Wolverhampton Wanderers, Ipswich Town and Coventry City midfielder.
 30 May 2016: Richie Foran, 35, former Carlisle United and Southend United midfielder.

References